Obuzbaşı is a village in the Mazgirt District, Tunceli Province, Turkey. The village is populated by Kurds of the Izol and Xiran tribes and had a population of 47 in 2021.

The hamlets of Uçankuş and Zeynel are attached to the village.

References 

Villages in Mazgirt District
Kurdish settlements in Tunceli Province